Press-A-Print International LLC is an American business that sells a business opportunity in the specialty printing industry. With over 3,500 Owner/Operators, Press-A-Print is the largest group of independent specialty printers/distributors.

Press-A-Print's investment programs offer a complete business platform, consisting of a range of equipment, supplies, training and services for creating, managing and growing a specialty printing business. In addition to providing equipment for specialty printers and promotional product distributors, Press-A-Print offers a range of entrepreneurial services, including lifetime technical and business support services, marketing services, supply-chain management, and purchasing and outsourcing programs.

See also
 Pad printing
 Promotional merchandise

References

Companies based in Idaho
Business opportunities
1986 establishments in Idaho